I'll Tell the World is a 1945 American comedy film directed by Leslie Goodwins and written by Henry Blankfort and Lester Pine. The film stars Lee Tracy, Brenda Joyce, Raymond Walburn, June Preisser, Thomas Gomez and Howard Freeman. The film was released on June 8, 1945, by Universal Pictures.

Plot

Cast        
Lee Tracy as Gabriel Patton
Brenda Joyce as Lorna Gray
Raymond Walburn as H.I. Bailey
June Preisser as Marge Bailey
Thomas Gomez as J.B. Kindell
Howard Freeman as Lester Westchester
Lorin Raker as Perkins
Janet Shaw as Switchboard Operator
Pierre Watkin as Dr. Mullins
Peter Potter as Announcer
Gene Rodgers as Piano Specialty
Jimmie Dean as Jimmie Dean 
Jean Aloise as Dance Specialty

References

External links
 

1945 films
American comedy films
1945 comedy films
Universal Pictures films
Films directed by Leslie Goodwins
American black-and-white films
1940s English-language films
1940s American films